John "Shôn" Eirwyn Ffowcs Williams  (1935–2020) was Emeritus Rank Professor of Engineering at the University of Cambridge and a former Master of Emmanuel College, Cambridge (1996–2002). He may be best known for his contributions to aeroacoustics, in particular for his work on Concorde. Together with one of his students, David Hawkings, he introduced the far-field integration method in computational aeroacoustics based on Lighthill's acoustic analogy, known as the Ffowcs Williams–Hawkings analogy.

Ffowcs was elected as a member into the National Academy of Engineering in 1995 for contributions to the theory of jet noise, and other aspects of aeroacoustics and hydrodynamics.

Education and early life
Born in Wales on 25 May 1935, Ffowcs Williams was educated at the Great Ayton Friends' School and Derby Technical College (now part of the University of Derby). He served an engineering apprenticeship with Rolls-Royce before going to the University of Southampton, he always maintained a strong commitment to bring academic research to bear on industrial problems. He was awarded Bachelor of Science degree and a PhD from the University of Southampton in 1961.

Career and research
He cofounded Topexpress Ltd, a consultancy company in Cambridge specialising in engineering science, was executive consultant to Rolls-Royce and a director of VSEL plc. For 25 years he led the division in which the University of Cambridge's Fluid Mechanics, Aeronautics, Thermodynamics, and Turbomachinery work is concentrated. 

He was admitted to his Professorial Fellowship at Emmanuel in 1973; he was the longest-serving professor in the University when he retired from his chair in 2002. He taught engineering for the College but, before becoming Master his main college contribution was serving on the Governing Body and its committees. He was the first holder of the Rank Chair of engineering established in 1972 in the field of acoustics, coming to Cambridge from Imperial College London, where he held the Rolls-Royce Chair in theoretical acoustics. His speciality was noise and vibration caused by unsteady flow. His main achievement was to persuade very good research students to tackle important but interesting problems which ranged from the aeroacoustics of supersonic flight, to the quietening of underwater platforms. His work helped make anti-sound useful for noise control and for stabilising unstable aeromechanical systems. 

His doctoral students include David Crighton, Steve Furber, and Ann Dowling.

He died on 12 December 2020.

Awards and honours
Ffowcs Williams was awarded an Honorary Doctor of Science (DSc) from the University of Southampton and Master of Arts and Doctor of Science (ScD) degrees from the University of Cambridge.
 He was elected a Fellow of the Royal Academy of Engineering (FREng) in 1988
 In 1984 he was awarded the Rayleigh Medal by the UK Institute of Acoustics.
 In 1989 he was awarded the Médaille Étrangère by the French Acoustic Society (SFA).
 In 1995 he was elected a member of the National Academy of Engineering 
 For his contributions to the foundations and applications of Aeroacoustics, which have enabled dramatic reductions in the noise of aircraft and submarines he was awarded the Sir Frank Whittle Medal by the Royal Academy of Engineering in 2002.
 He was elected a Fellow of the Royal Aeronautical Society (FRAeS) 
 He was elected a Fellow of the Royal Society of Arts (FRSA) 
 He was elected a Fellow of the Institute of Physics (FinstP)

Notes

References

1935 births
2020 deaths
Academics of Imperial College London
Masters of Emmanuel College, Cambridge
Fellows of the Royal Academy of Engineering
Fellows of the Institute of Physics
Fellows of the Royal Aeronautical Society
Welsh engineers
Place of birth missing
20th-century British engineers
21st-century British engineers
Fluid dynamicists
Professors of engineering (Cambridge)